Landsat 4 is the fourth satellite of the Landsat program. It was launched on July 16, 1982, with the primary goal of providing a global archive of satellite imagery. Although the Landsat Program is managed by NASA, data from Landsat 4 was collected and distributed by the U.S. Geological Survey. Landsat 4 science operations ended on December 14, 1993, when the satellite lost its ability to transmit science data, far beyond its designed life expectancy of five years. The satellite housekeeping telemetry and tracking continued to be maintained by NASA until it was decommissioned on June 15, 2001.

Background 
Landsat 1, then known as ERTA-A, was launched July 23, 1972. The satellite took over 100,000 images of the Earth over the course of its life. Landsat 2 had a similar design, and was launched three years later. Landsat 3, launched in 1978, was the last satellite to have a similar design to Landsat 1, and was the last Landsat to be managed by NASA during the Landsat program. Landsat 4 was the first Landsat to be operated by NOAA.

The second generation of Landsat, Landsat 4 and 5, flew in lower orbits than the first three missions. Although they were in lower orbits, they had a higher field of view (FOV) so they had the same swath widths. The new Landsat spacecraft also featured improved instrumentation.

Satellite design

Operation
The spacecraft was built by GE Astro Space, who would later become Lockheed Martin Missile and Space. It used the MultiMission Modular Spacecraft (MMS) bus developed by Fairchild Industries.

The satellite was designed to be fixed by astronauts in space via the Space Shuttle, or taken back to Earth for repairs. It was expected that the shuttles would be able to reach Landsat's relatively far orbit by 1985.

Landsat 4's attitude was controlled with hydrazine thrusters. The satellite was constructed with aluminum panels and graphite struts. The spacecraft was three-axis stabilized with reaction wheels. It was powered by three nickel-cadmium batteries (NiCd), which were charged via a single solar array that had one axis of articulation. The solar array produced 1430 W of power. Landsat 4 was designed to last a minimum of three years.

The satellite communicated to the ground with a direct downlink with the Tracking and Data Relay Satellite System (TDRSS) at 85 Mbit/s on the S-, X-, L-, and Ku-bands. The high gain antenna was extended with a retractable boom. The data used 8 bit quantization.

Sensors

Landsat 4 carried an updated Multispectral Scanner (MSS), used on previous Landsat satellites, and a Thematic Mapper. Both were built by Hughes Aircraft.

Landsat 4 was the first satellite in the Landsat program to incorporate the Thematic Mapper (TM) sensor. The Landsat TM sensor is able to gather seven bands of data as opposed to the four bands of data collected from the Multispectral Scanner. In addition to having three more bands of data to work with, scientists are able to view the TM data at a much higher resolution than with MSS. The data rate for TM data was 84.9Mbit/s, via an X-band transmitter to modernized ground antennas.

Mission

Launch 
The satellite was launched from Vandenberg Air Force Base in California on July 16, 1982, on a Delta 3920.

Operations

The first major malfunction occurred July 27, 1982. The high gain Ku antenna was commanded to deploy but failed. Attempts to free the antenna were successful on August 15.

In February 1983, the satellite lost half of its solar power and the ability to send science data directly to Earth, prompting fears the satellite would fail sooner than expected. This caused the early launch of Landsat 5, a satellite that was identical in specification to Landsat 4. After the issue was identified in Landsat 4, modifications were made to Landsat 5 to prevent the same issue from occurring.

Landsat 4 was able to resume science operations when the Tracking and Data Relay Satellite System (TDRS) came online, then was placed in standby in January 1986. Landsat 4 was brought back online to provide international coverage in 1987, when Landsat 5 lost its TDRS link, and thus the ability to image areas beyond line of sight to a ground station, and continued to do so until it, too, lost its TDRS link in 1993, ending science data return. Landsat 4 continued to broadcast telemetry, tracking, and command data, which was transmitted on the still-functional S-band, until the satellite was decommissioned June 15, 2001.

Space Shuttle service mission
As early as 1982, a mission was in the planning stages to retrieve Landsat 4 for servicing back on earth. The 1982 edition of the STS Flight Assignment Manifest scheduled the second Space Shuttle mission from Vandenberg AFB for that task. The Space Shuttle orbiter Discovery was scheduled to launch on 15 June 1986 for a three-day mission to capture Landsat 4 for return to earth (designated STS-2V). The following year, the mission was rescheduled to launch on 1 April 1986. Later on, the idea to retrieve Landsat 4 were first replaced by a servicing mission in early 1987, before any mention of it was removed from the flight manifest published in June 1985. The slot for the proposed mission was first assigned to a dedicated Space Shuttle flight for the Department of Defense before the idea of launching the Space Shuttle from Vandenberg AFB were scrapped altogether after the Challenger disaster.

References

External links

NASA's Landsat 4 Website
CEOS MIM Database Landsat 4 Entry

Spacecraft launched in 1982
Spacecraft launched by Delta rockets
Landsat program